Sunomata can may refer to various places and events in Japan:

The former town of Sunomata, Gifu, now part of the city of Ōgaki, Gifu Prefecture
The Nagara River, formerly called the Sunomata River, in Gifu, Aichi, and Mie Prefectures
Sunomata Castle in Ōgaki, Gifu Prefecture
The Battle of Sunomata-gawa